Adventure SA  (doing business as Adventure Paramotors) is a French aircraft manufacturer based in Méré, Yonne. The company was founded by Guy Léon-Dufour; Andrea Testoni is the current president and general manager. The company specializes in the design and manufacture of paramotors.

The company was founded in 1990 in Paris, France and was one of the earliest manufacturers of paramotors. Their products have been widely sold and achieved a good safety record.

Bertrand et al said of the company in 2003:

Aircraft

References

External links

Aircraft manufacturers of France
Paramotors
Companies based in Bourgogne-Franche-Comté